The  Wales Rally GB 2015 was the thirteenth and last round of the 2015 World Rally Championship season, held over 12–15 November 2015. The rally was won by Sébastien Ogier, his eight victory of the 2015 WRC season. It was also noticeable for the discovery and subsequent murder investigation of the Clocaenog Forest Man by two spectators.

Entry list

Classification

Event standings

Special stages

Power Stage

References

Wales
Rally GB
Wales Rally
Wales Rally GB